The Department of Housing and Construction was an Australian government department that existed between December 1978 and May 1982.

Scope
Information about the department's functions and/or government funding allocation could be found in the Administrative Arrangements Orders, the annual Portfolio Budget Statements and in the Department's annual reports.

The functions of the Department at its creation were:
Planning, execution and maintenance of Commonwealth Government Works
Housing
Building industry
Design and maintenance of furniture, furnishings and fittings for the Commonwealth Government

Structure
The Department was a Commonwealth Public Service department, staffed by officials who were responsible to the Minister for Housing and Construction.

References

Housing and Construction
Ministries established in 1978